The Zhuzhou International Circuit is a  FIA Grade 2 motorsport circuit in Zhuzhou, China. The circuit was built between March 2018 and October 2019.

Lap records

The official fastest race lap records at the Zhuzhou International Circuit are listed as:

Notes

References

Motorsport venues in Hunan
Sports venues completed in 2019
2019 establishments in China